Petra is a historical village in the Preveza Prefecture in western Greece, near the town of Filippiada. According to the Greek census 2011, it had 392 inhabitants.

The exact origin of the name " Petra " is not known, but according to Serafim Xenopoulos, the village was named after its place on the east side of a rocky hill.

References 

Populated places in Preveza (regional unit)

Villages in Greece